The Taiwan Lighting Fixture Export Association (TLFEA; ; as abbreviated as 台灣區照明公會) is administratively guided by the Ministry of the Interior of the Republic of China established in March 1989. TLFEA currently has over 850 members specializing in the light fixture industry, with its headquarters located in Sanchong District, New Taipei City, Taiwan.

History
TLFEA formed on 23 March 1989. There are now over 850 corporate members. Its intended purpose is to:

 Improve foreign trade
 Promote economic growth,
 Enhance communication and interaction
 Increase mutual interests.

Organization
General assembly as the highest organization gathering once every year, to elect the members on both Board of Director and Board of Supervisor (3 years as 1 term). There are 27 directors on the board to elect the 9 executive directors, the president of TLFEA being elected from 9 executives. Mr. Huang Ming-Chih (黃明智), is the present president,  Mr. Fung Song-Yang (馮松陽),  Mr. Kang Wen-Jie (康文杰), Mr. Tung Hsien-Yuan (董顯元), and Mr. Chen, Bing-Hung (陳炳宏) are as Vice-Presidents of TLFEA.

Board of Supervisor has 9 members to elect 3 executive supervisors, then elect again to decide the convener. Mr. Yaw Wen (姚文) is the present convener of TLFEA.

Secretary office is managed under the president, having 9 full-time employees to deal with the general affairs, with Mr. Li Hui-Yang (李輝陽) as the secretary general TLFEA.

List of President

Committee 
 General Affairs Committee (Chairman: Mr. Yang Hung-Yu((楊弘裕))), North district Sodality (Chairman: Ms. Lee Shiu-Ling((李秀玲))), Central district Sodality( Chairman: Ms. Chen Shuei Jeng(((陳雪貞))), South district Sodality (Chairman: Mr. Kuo Rui-Fu((郭瑞富))).
 Lighting Technology Committee (Chairman: Mr. Dong Hsien-Yuan((董顯元)))
 Industrial League Committee (Chairman: Ms. Chien Yu-Mei((簡玉美)))
 International Affairs Committee (Chairman: Mr. Michael Hsieh((謝勝文))), Taiwan-Japan Lighting Industry Exchanging Sodality (Chairman: Mr. Chang Shang-Hsien)
 Exhibition Affairs Committee (Chairman: Mr. Hung Ming-Zhi((黃明智)))
 Information Affairs Committee (Chairman: Mr. Chiang De-Chung((江德聰)))
 Education and Training Affairs Committee (Chairman: Mr. Edward Po((柏健生)))
 Lighting Development Committee (Chairman: Mr. Chiu Wen-Liang((邱文良)))
 New Generation Lighting Committee (Chairman: Mr. Arron Cheng((鄭遠智)))
 Cross-Straits Lighting Committee( Chairman: Mr. Lin Ching-Fang((林慶芳)))

Cross-Straits and International Cooperation 
 China Illuminating Engineering Society: 1994
 Global Lighting Association (GLA): 2010.
 Zhaga Consortium: 2013
 Polish Association of Lighting Industry: 2013
 Turkish Lighting Luminaire Association: 2013 
 Japan Lighting Manufacturers Association: 2014

Exhibition 
 Taiwan International Lighting Show 
 Lighting Japan
 Lighting Fair Tokyo/ LED Next Stage Show
 Frankfurt Light and Building Show
 Guangzhou International Lighting Show
 Light India
 Taitronics Show
 Hong Kong International Lightins Show (Autumn Edition)
 Lighting Middle East
 Interlight Moscow
 Taipei International Architecture and Construction Show

References

External links
 

Light fixtures
1989 establishments in Taiwan
Organizations established in 1989
Organizations based in Taipei